The Republic of Kosovo is recognised by 112 UN member states, as well as the Republic of China (Taiwan), Sovereign Military Order of Malta, the Cook Islands and Niue; 22 of which have opened embassies in Pristina. Other states have retained representation offices.

Missions in Pristina

Embassies 

 (details)
 (details)

Diplomatic offices

Liaison offices

International organisations 

 

 (details)
 Organization for Security and Co-operation in Europe (details)
 International Monetary Fund
 (details)
 World Bank

Consular missions 
Prizren
 (Consulate-General)

Non-resident accredited embassies 

 (Sofia)
 (Zagreb)
 (Berlin)
 (Zagreb)
 (Vienna) 
 (Vienna)
 (Vienna)
 (Ankara)
 (Berlin)
 (Brussels)
 (Budapest)
 (Ankara)
 (Tirana)
 (Prague)
 (Tirana)
 (Zagreb)
 (Rome)
 (La Valletta)
 (Rome)
 (Ankara)
 (Vienna)
 (Skopje)
 (Budapest)
 (Tirana)
 (San Marino)
 (Tirana) 
 (Podgorica)

See also
List of diplomatic missions of Kosovo
Foreign relations of Kosovo

Notes

  No diplomatic relations or diplomatic recognition.
  No diplomatic relations. The noted missions include the Republic of Kosovo in their consular districts.

References

External links
Ministry of Foreign Affairs, Republic of Kosovo
Missions in Kosovo
Kosovo diplomatic list
Kosovo diplomatic list 2022

Diplomatic missions
Kosovo
Foreign relations of Kosovo
Independence of Kosovo